Gabriël Alphonse Alexander (Gaby) Minneboo (born 12 June 1945) is a retired cyclist from the Netherlands who won the Amateur UCI Motor-paced World Championships in 1975–1977, 1980 and 1982. He finished in third place in 1972, 1973 and 1979. After retiring in 1983 he founded a company manufacturing sports trophies and awards.

References

1945 births
Living people
Dutch male cyclists
People from Veere
Cyclists from Zeeland